The Devil's Mate is a 1933 American pre-Code mystery film directed by Phil Rosen, starring Peggy Shannon and Preston Foster.

It was remade by Rosen as I Killed That Man (1941).

Plot
As murderer Maloney is being executed in the electric chair, he's willing to expose an underworld mob boss.  He is killed by a poison dart before he can tell anything.  Inspector O'Brien suspects McGhee, a ward healer and friend of Maloney; Parkhurst, a scholar, philanthropist, and candidate for the prison board; Clinton, a friend of Parkhurst; or Natural, a reporter for the "Chronicle" newspaper.  Since McGhee is a nonsmoker and found in possession of an empty cigarette case, he is arrested.

Cast
 Peggy Shannon as Nancy Weaver
 Preston Foster as Inspector O'Brien
 Ray Walker as Natural
 Hobart Cavanaugh as Parkhurst
 Barbara Barondess as Gwen
 Paul Porcasi as Nick
 Harold Waldridge as Joe
 Jason Robards Sr. as Clinton
 Bryant Washburn as District Attorney
 Harry Holman as McGee
 George 'Gabby' Hayes as Collins
 James Durkin as Warden
 Gordon De Main as Butler
 Paul Fix as Maloney

References

External links
Devil's Mate at TCMDB
I Killed That Man at IMDb

1933 films
American mystery drama films
American black-and-white films
1930s mystery drama films
1933 drama films
Films directed by Phil Rosen
1930s American films
1930s English-language films